Constitution is an unincorporated community in Washington County, in the U.S. state of Ohio.

History
A post office called Constitution was established in 1842, and remained in operation until 1978. The community's name commemorates the contribution a local settler, Ephraim Cutler, made to outlaw slavery in the Constitution of Ohio.

References

Unincorporated communities in Washington County, Ohio
Unincorporated communities in Ohio